Sukhumvit can refer to:

 Sukhumvit Road, one of the four major highways of Thailand, which follows a coastal route from Bangkok to Trat
 Phra Bisal Sukhumvit, who the road was named after
 Sukhumvit Line of the BTS Skytrain in Bangkok
 Sukhumvit MRT station on the Mass Rapid Transit, Bangkok

See also
 
 Sukhumi (disambiguation)